Robert K. Shaw (born March 16, 1947) is a former American football wide receiver who played for the New Orleans Saints of the National Football League (NFL). He played college football at Winston-Salem State University.

References 

Living people

Winston-Salem State Rams football players

1947 births
American football wide receivers
New Orleans Saints players